Salad of a Thousand Delights is a live performance video produced by Box Dog Video featuring the Melvins. It was recorded in a four-camera shoot at the North Shore Surf Club, Olympia, Washington, May 16, 1991 and released on VHS in 1992. The video was rereleased on DVD (90 mins) in 2002, with bonus live and live-in-the-studio material.

Track listing
"Antitoxidote"
"Euthanasia"
"Zodiac"
"Oven"
"If I Had An Exorcism"
"Boris"
"Kool Legged"
"Wispy"
"It's Shoved"
"Anaconda"
"We Reach"
"Hog Leg"

Personnel
Buzz Osborne - guitar, vocals
Dale Crover - drums, vocals
Joe Preston - bass, vocals

Additional personnel
Jo Smitty - editing, executive producer
Paul Uusitalo -  camera, sound, editing, executive producer
Bob Basanich - camera
Craig Joyce - camera
RE. Bassanova - shaman box
Todd Morey - cover graphics
Greg Babar (aka Babar the Elephant) - sound
Matt Lukin - bass ("Rehearsal" bonus video on DVD, uncredited)
Mike Dillard - drums (audio of the "Rehearsal" video, uncredited)

References

1992 video albums
Melvins video albums
Melvins live albums
1992 live albums
Live video albums